Allan Gray is an investment management company from South Africa. The company also has offices in Botswana, Namibia and Eswatini, and maintains a close relationship with sister companies Orbis Investment Management and Allan Gray Australia. Its clients include institutional investors, individual investors, insurance companies, trusts, foundations and foreign institutions.

History 

Allan Gray Investment Counsel was founded in October 1973 by Allan W.B Gray. The firm won its first client in 1974. In 1989, Gray set up Orbis Investment Management, an international investment management company.

The firm was incorporated and changed its name to Allan Gray Limited in 1992. In 1996, the firm opened an office in Windhoek, Namibia. In 1998, the firm started offering retail investment products. An office was established in Gaborone, Botswana in 2004.

Operations 

Allan Gray invests in assets across the African continent and employs over 1,000 employees.  The company's Cape Town headquarters are in the Silo District of the V&A Waterfront. Silo One, the headquarter building, was the first in South Africa to be given a six-star green rating by the Green Building Council of South Africa.

Investment offering 
Retail investors can invest in Allan Gray’s selection of unit trusts through a range of investment products. The investment manager currently offers basic unit trust investments, tax-free investments, offshore investments, retirement annuities, preservation funds, living annuities and endowments. 

Institutional investors are able to invest in unit trusts, life pooled portfolios and segregated portfolios, depending on the type of institution and the size of their investment. 

Allan Gray also offers group savings solutions for employers through the Allan Gray Umbrella Retirement Fund  and the Allan Gray Group Retirement Annuity.

Social Investment 

Allan Gray's social investment efforts are directed towards the Allan Gray Orbis Foundation and E Squared, which aim to educate potential entrepreneurs and provide them with financing. The Foundation is funded by an annual donation of 5% of Allan Gray Proprietary Limited's pre-tax profit and a $150 million endowment from Allan W.B Gray. E Squared owns 20% of Allan Gray Limited.

Ownership 
A controlling interest in Allan Gray is held in perpetuity by Allan & Gill Gray Foundation. Other shareholders include past and present employees and E Squared. Allan & Gill Gray Foundation is designed to exist in perpetuity to ensure that the distributable profits are ultimately devoted exclusively to philanthropy and to promote the commercial success, continuity and independence of the Allan Gray business.

References

External links
 Allan Gray
 Allan Gray Orbis Foundation
 Orbis Investment Management
 E2
 
Financial services companies established in 1973
Financial services companies of South Africa
Investment management companies of South Africa
Companies based in Cape Town